Peter Martin James (born 4 October 1971) is a former English cricketer.  James was a right-handed batsman who played primarily as a wicketkeeper.  He was born in Kensington, London.

James represented the Surrey Cricket Board in 3 List A matches against Norfolk and Cheshire in the 1999 NatWest Trophy, and Shropshire in the 2000 NatWest Trophy.  In his 3 List A matches, he scored 32 runs at a batting average of 32.00, with a high score of 23*.  Behind the stumps he took 2 catches.

References

External links
Peter James at Cricinfo
Peter James at CricketArchive

1971 births
Living people
Sportspeople from Kensington
Cricketers from Greater London
English cricketers
Surrey Cricket Board cricketers
Wicket-keepers